The following are links to international rankings of Denmark.

Economy

United Nations Development Programme: Gini Index ranking 1 out of 182 (2010)
The Heritage Foundation: Index of Economic Freedom ranking 8 out of 179 (2011)
International Monetary Fund: Income per capita in purchasing power parity ranked  17 out of 181 (2010)
United Nations Development Programme:  Human Development Index ranked 16 out of 187 (2011)
 Gallup World Poll: The World's Happiest Countries ranked  out 1 of 155 (2009)
World Economic Forum: Global Competitiveness Report ranked 9 out of 133 (2010-2011)

Environmental
 Yale University: Environmental Sustainability Index ranked 26 out of 146 countries (2005)

Military

Institute for Economics and Peace: Global Peace Index ranked 4 out of 153 (2011)

Politics

 Fund for Peace: Failed States Index ranked 173 out of 177 - sustainable (2011)
Transparency International: Corruption Perceptions Index ranked 1 out of 180 (2010)
Reporters Without Borders: Press Freedom Index ranked 11 out of 178 (2010)
The Economist:  Democracy Index ranked  3 out of 167 (2010)

Social
 Economist Intelligence Unit: Where-to-be-born Index, ranked 5 out of 80 (2013)
Social Progress Index: ranked 2 out of 163 countries (2020)
University of Leicester: Satisfaction with Life Index 2006, ranked 1 out of 178 countries
OECD: Physicians per 1000 Population 2007, ranked 15 out of 30 countries

References

Denmark